Martial was a 1st-century Roman poet.

Martial may refer to something of military style or warlike.

Martial may also refer to:

People
 Saint Martial, 3rd-century bishop of Limoges
 Martial Bild (born 1961), French journalist and politician
 Martial Caillebotte (1853–1910), French philatelist, photographer and composer
 Martial Célestin (1913–2011), Prime Minister of Haiti in 1988
 Martial Gueroult (1891–1976), French philosopher
 Martial Mbandjock (born 1985), French sprinter
 Martial Henri Merlin (1860–1935), French colonial administrator
 Martial Raysse (born 1936), French artist and actor
 Martial Robin (born 1977), French footballer
 Martial Singher (1904–1990), French baritone opera singer
 Martial Solal (born 1927), French-Algerian jazz pianist and composer
 Martial Yao (born 1989), Ivorian footballer
 Anthony Martial (born 1995), French footballer, brother of Johan Martial and cousin of Alexis Martial
 Alexis Martial (born 2001), French footballer
 Carlton Martial (born 1999), American football player
 Johan Martial (born 1991), French footballer
 Romain Martial (born 1984), French rugby union player
 Yeo Martial (born 1944), Ivorian football manager

Other uses
 Martial Mountains, Argentina
 Martial (crater), a crater on Mercury
 Martial (horse), an Irish thoroughbred racehorse
 Martial eagle, a species of eagle

See also

 Marital, of or related to marriage
 Martialis (cognomen) (disambiguation) 

Masculine given names